Checkered Flag is the third studio album of surf music by surf music pioneer Dick Dale and his Del-Tones, released in 1963. This is Dale's first entry into the "Hot Rod" style of surf music, which The Beach Boys, among others, were beginning to perform and record. Here the style shifts somewhat and features slightly altered beats and some added sounds to give the impression of the energy of Hot-rodding (this is not always the case though). The majority of the songs on this album are titled with themes of racing and Hot-rodding. Dale's next album Mr. Eliminator is basically a follow-up to this, featuring more surf songs of Hot-Rod nature.

Track listing 
All tracks composed by Dick Dale; except where indicated
"The Scavenger" (Gary Paxton, Paul Nuckles) – 1:54
"Surf Buggy" – 2:07
"Hot Rod Racer" (Eddie Daniels, Jerry Capehart) – 2:19
"Mag Wheels" (Gary Usher, Richard Burns) – 1:58
"Big Black Cad" (Gary Usher, Roger Christian) – 1:40
"Ho-dad Machine" – 2:06
"Grudge Run" (Gary Paxton, Paul Nuckles) – 3:05
"Motion" – 1:44
"426–Super Stock" (Gary Usher, Roger Christian) – 1:52
"The Wedge" – 2:01
"It Will Grow On You" (Carol Connors, Marshall Howard Connors) – 1:33
"Night Rider" – 1:47

References

Dick Dale albums
1963 albums
Capitol Records albums